Dangemannia is a genus of green algae in the family Oltmannsiellopsidaceae.

The genus name of Dangemannia is in honour of Pierre Jean Louis Dangeard (1895–1970), who was a French botanist and Peter Kornmann (1907–1993), a German botanist.

The genus was circumscribed by Thomas Friedl and Charles J. O'Kelly in Eur. J. Phycol. Vol.37 on page 382 in 2002.

References

External links

Ulvophyceae genera
Oltmannsiellopsidales